Penicillium jamesonlandense is a psychrotolerant species of the genus of Penicillium. Penicillium jamesonlandense produces patulin

Further reading

References

jamesonlandense
Fungi described in 2006